Momoland The Best ~Korean Ver.~ is a compilation album by South Korean girl group Momoland. It was released by King Records on February 28, 2018. The album features the group's songs from their first two extended plays Welcome to Momoland and Freeze!; along with their sophomore single "Wonderful Love" and its EDM version.

Commercially, the album peaked at number twenty-six on Japan's Oricon Albums Chart.

Commercial performance
In Japan, the compilation album debuted and peaked at number twenty-six on the Oricon Albums Chart. It sold 2,745 physical copies.

Track listing

Charts

Release history

References

Momoland albums
2018 compilation albums
Korean-language compilation albums